Addiscombe West is a ward in the London Borough of Croydon, covering much of the Addiscombe and East Croydon areas of London in the United Kingdom. It extends from East Croydon railway station towards  Woodside Green but does not actually cover the retail centre of Addiscombe, which is in the neighbouring Addiscombe East ward.

The ward currently forms part of the Croydon Central constituency, which was the most marginal in London at the 2015 General Election, as 165 votes separated the Conservatives and Labour. At the 2017 General Election, Gavin Barwell was ousted as the local MP. Despite achieving the highest numerical vote share for the Conservatives since 1992, he was replaced by Labour's Sarah Jones. Shortly after losing his seat, Barwell was appointed Downing Street Chief of Staff by Theresa May, following the resignations of Fiona Hill and Nick Timothy on 10 June.

For the 2018 London local elections, the ward has been created, consisting of most of the former Addiscombe Ward (as well as part of the old Fairfield ward).

List of Councillors

Mayoral election results 
Below are the results for the candidate which received the highest share of the popular vote in the ward at each mayoral election.

Ward Results

References

External links
Council Elections 2006 results - Addiscombe
Addiscombe Councillors
 London Borough of Croydon map of wards.

Wards of the London Borough of Croydon